This article shows statistics of individual players for the Osijek football club. It also lists all matches that Osijek played in the 2012–13 season.

First-team squad

Competitions

Overall

Prva HNL

Results summary

Results by round

Matches

Prva HNL

Europa League

Croatian Cup

Sources: Prva-HNL.hr

Player seasonal records
Competitive matches only. Updated to games played 20 April 2013.

Top scorers

Source: Competitive matches

Appearances and goals

Sources: Prva-HNL.hr, UEFA.com

References

2012-13
Croatian football clubs 2012–13 season